Gangland Undercover is a Canadian-American factual based drama television series written and created by Executive Producer Stephen Kemp and co-writer Noel Baker. It was inspired by the story of Charles Falco a former ATF confidential informant (CI) who infiltrated an outlaw motorcycle club. The series is based on the memoir Vagos, Mongols, and Outlaws: My Infiltration of America's Deadliest Biker Gangs written by Charles Falco with Kerrie Droban. It premiered on Tuesday, February 24, 2015, on the History Channel at 10/9c. In Canada, Season 2 premiered on September 26, 2016. In the U.S., only the first episode of season 2 aired on December 8, 2016, on A&E. According to the trailer, "the new season" (Season 2) premiered on March 2, 2017. History US has cancelled Gangland Undercover just three episodes into Season 2.

Premise
A description at the beginning of the first episode stated: "This program is based on Charles Falco's account of events that took place between 2003 and 2006, when he infiltrated one of America's most notorious biker gangs. Names, locations and key details have been changed to protect the identities of those involved."

Opening Introduction (narrated by Charles Falco – voice disguised):

Cast

Main cast
Damon Runyan as Charles Falco, meth dealer-turned-ATF confidential informant, undercover in the Vagos Motorcycle Club; he's nicknamed Quick, from a "hang-around", a prospect to a full-patched member. In Season 2, he is in the witness protection program and goes undercover as a prospect named Chef in the Mongols Motorcycle Club, and later a member of the Outlaws Motorcycle Club.	
Ari Cohen as Mike Kozinski (aka Koz), ATF special agent and Falco's handler. In Season 2, as Ziggy, an undercover Mongols Sargeant-at-Arms, Pomona Chapter 
Paulino Nunes as Schizo, Vagos Chapter President
James Cade as Stash, Vagos prospect-turned-full-patched member 
Ian Matthews as Darko, Vagos Sergeant-at-Arms. In Season 2, he is an ATF CI as a member of the probationary chapter of the Outlaws.
Stephen Eric McIntyre as Kid, Vagos Vice President and Falco's prospect sponsor. In Season 2 as The Devil, Outlaws President
Don Francks as Lizard, Vagos Road Captain
Melanie Scrofano as Suzanna, Stella's friend and Falco's girlfriend

Season 2

Thomas Mitchell as Bullet, ATF special agent working undercover as a member of the Mongols, their Sergeant-at-Arms. He starts up a new probationary chapter for the Outlaws.
Hannah Anderson as Sarah Jane, a waitress at the Tulip Diner Charlie befriends 
Shaun Benson as Crowbar, Pagans President 
Joanne Boland as Meredith Jones/Wilson, ATF field operations management and Bullet's handler

Supporting/recurring cast

Season 1

Kiran Friesen as Stella, Schizo's "old lady" (wife)
Ashley Tredenick as Red, Kid's old lady
Patricia McKenzie as Samantha Kiles, detective in the San Bernardino Organized Crime Unit
Jessica Huras as Natalie Falco, ex-wife of Charles Falco
Markus Parillo as Felix, Vagos International President
John Tench as Green, Vagos member of Australian chapter, ATF informant
Romano Orzari as Bernard, Falco's former meth business partner

Season 2

Chris Ratz as Dirtbag, Pagans Sergeant-at-Arms 
Sora Olah as Sherri, Charlie's witness protection handler
Pedro Miguel Arce as Paco, a local gunrunner
Christian Bako as Sputnik, Outlaws member who's Russian
Dan Masters as Foghorn, Outlaws member who's a mute
Brendan Eckstrom as Razor, Merciless Souls (Maggots) Sergeant-at-Arms
Justin Mader as Sniper
Ryan Blakely as Bug (Chester Peters), a former felon-turned-ATF CI who joins Bullet's Outlaws probationary chapter. 
Andrew Jackson as Tug, Mongols National Sergeant-at-Arms
Michael Copeland as Miles, Mongols International President
Ivan Wanis Ruiz as Hector, Surenos gang leader

Guest cast
Ron Kennell as Reese, liquid methamphetamine drug dealer (Season 1)
Daniel Williston as Hammer, former Vagos member and Schizo's buddy, believed to be a snitch (Season 1)
Michael Reventar as Thor, Falco's cellmate at FCI Lompoc (Season 1)
Alejandro Ampudia as El Toro Malo, head prison guard at FCI Lompoc (Season 1)
Brayden Jones as Lucky, past Mongols prospect turned member in 1977 (Season 2)

Motorcycle clubs hierarchies

Series overview

Episodes

Season 1 (2015)

Season 2 (2016-2017)
Note: * The first episode first aired in the U.S. on December 8, 2016, on A&E. It re-aired on March 2, 2017, returning to History Channel; after the third episode the show was pulled from the schedule.

See also
List of outlaw motorcycle clubs
List of Motorcycle Club terms
Vagos Motorcycle Club

References

External links

fan site

2015 American television series debuts
English-language television shows
History (American TV channel) original programming
Serial drama television series
Television shows based on books
Motorcycle television series
Fictional motorcycle clubs
Television series about organized crime
Television series by Cineflix
Works about outlaw motorcycle clubs
Works about organized crime in the United States
Bureau of Alcohol, Tobacco, Firearms and Explosives in fiction
Television series about witness protection